Thomas Francis Patrick McCarthy (September 15, 1934 – January 20, 1992) was a Canadian professional ice hockey left winger who played four seasons in the National Hockey League for the Detroit Red Wings and Boston Bruins between 1956 and 1961. The rest of his career, which lasted from 1955 to 1973, was spent in various minor leagues. McCarthy was selected in the 15th round of the 1967 NHL Expansion Draft by the Pittsburgh Penguins, going 88th overall.

Personal life
He married Marlene Weaver and became the father of two daughters and one son, Carol, Johan, and Martin. He had five grandchildren: grandsons Bryan, Thomas, and granddaughters Erin, Holly, and Kelly.

He died in Toronto in January 1992.

Career statistics

Regular season and playoffs

References

External links

1934 births
1992 deaths
Baltimore Clippers players
Boston Bruins players
Canadian ice hockey left wingers
Cleveland Barons (1937–1973) players
Detroit Red Wings players
Edmonton Flyers (WHL) players
Hershey Bears players
Kingston Frontenacs (EPHL) players
Ontario Hockey Association Senior A League (1890–1979) players
Portland Buckaroos players
Providence Reds players
Rochester Americans players
Ice hockey people from Toronto
Sudbury Wolves (EPHL) players
Toronto Marlboros players
Tulsa Oilers (1964–1984) players
Vancouver Canucks (WHL) players